Capstan may refer to:
Capstan (band), an American post-hardcore band
Capstan (cigarette), a brand of British cigarette
Capstan (nautical), a rotating machine used to control or apply force to another element
Capstan (tape recorder), rotating spindles used to move recording tape through the mechanism of a tape recorder
Capstan equation, formula to describe hold-force in relation to load-force for flexible lines around a cylinder
Horse capstan, a device similar to a windlass used in mining; also called a whim
Slingsby Capstan, a British two-seat glider of the 1960s
Capstan (software), audio restoration program by Celemony which eliminates wow and flutter

See also

Rack and pinion